FDX, short for Fast Data eXchange is a proprietary maritime communication protocol by Nexus Marine AB.

It describes how data points from sensors are to be sent across an RS485 serial bus to displays. FDX was originally developed in the 1990s, and is now mostly seen as a legacy protocol. The GND10 gateway from Garmin translates FDX into NMEA 2000, to be able to continue using Nexus sensors on more recent NMEA 2000 networks.

References

External links
 FDX introduction from Nexus Marine
 http://www.cruisersforum.com/forums/f13/nexus-bus-or-fdx-protocol-164575.html
 Github: Reverse engineered FDX parser

 Global Positioning System
Computer buses
Marine electronics